Arts & Communication Magnet Academy (ACMA) is a publicly funded arts magnet school in Beaverton, Oregon, United States. It is a member of the International Network of Schools for the Advancement of Arts Education.

The school opened in 1992, in facilities which previously served as a Beaverton School District elementary school, C.E. Mason Elementary, opened in 1949.  It was originally called the Arts & Communications High School. The school was rebuilt in 2020 and reopened the school year 2021-2022, following the passage of a bond measure in May 2014.

Academics
In 2008, 100% of the school's seniors received a high school diploma. Of 60 students, 60 graduated and none dropped out.

The school received a silver ranking from U.S. News & World Reports 2010 "America's Best High Schools" survey.

Theatre company
Taking a prominent role in the school since the construction and completion of a new Performing Arts Center in early 2010, ACMA's theatre company has been widely acclaimed as one of the best in the school district. Headed by teacher and director Shaun Hennessy (since 2015-2016), previously headed by actor/director Joel Morello, the company has produced plays and musicals such as Bullshot Crummond, The Apple Tree, Midsummer Night's Dream, Much Ado About Nothing, Spoon River Anthology, The Good Doctor, Dancing at Lughnasa, Alice in Wonderland, A Greater Tuna, Celebration, The Fantasticks, Little Shop of Horrors, an acclaimed production of Godspell, which was sponsored by The Oregonian, and original verbatim stage adaptations of The Great Gatsby and Great Expectations. Godspell was the first production that was involved with ACMA's Theatre Giving Program.

Plays are not always necessarily produced by the department head; different theatrical artists in the community are given opportunities to direct and cast the show as they please. In addition, the company produces an annual One Act Festival featuring student written and directed work starring middle school students with little to no experience in the program thus far, as an introduction to how the shows work. For the 2013-2014 season, guest directors directed Our Town in the fall and Oliver! in the spring. In winter 2014, an original staged production of Coraline written, directed and produced by ACMA students graced the mainstage. Besides other student written works, such as the ACMA Zone (one-acts based on the Twilight Zone) and ACMA Live (based on Saturday Night Live) the spring 2015 production was Pride and Prejudice, directed by David Sikking. The 2018 season will include The Laramie Project, Much Ado About Nothing, Hamlet, Heathers, and Trouble in Paradise Junction.

Jazz orchestra
The award-winning ACMA jazz program consists of the beginning level Concert Band, the intermediate level Symphonic Band, and the advanced level Jazz Orchestra. The jazz program is currently under the direction of Conte Bennett. Previous program directors include Thara Memory and Robert Crowell. Current Directors are Conte Bennet and Maryanne Campbell. ACMA jazz bands perform and compete annually in music festivals across the Pacific Northwest.

Dance West company
ACMA students comprise Dance West, a pre-professional dance program. Company repertoire includes pieces based on classical ballet, jazz, historical modern, innovative hip-hop, Broadway, concert tap, and pieces that range across all genres, taught by master teachers and guest artists.

School newspaper
ACMA students previously ran a school newspaper named The Savant, which covered the school's activities and news, along with the local Beaverton community. It was terminated at the beginning of the 2012–2013 school year.

Career pathways 
 Communications Arts
 Moving Image Arts
 Writing
 Performing Arts
 Dance
 Music (Vocal or Instrumental)
 Theatre
 Visual Arts
 Ceramics and Sculpture
 Drawing and Painting
 Photography

Notable alumni 
 Alex Frost, actor
 Haruka Weiser, murder victim, class of 2015
 Aparna Brielle, actress, class of 2012

References

Public middle schools in Oregon
Educational institutions established in 1992
High schools in Washington County, Oregon
Education in Beaverton, Oregon
Alternative schools in Oregon
Buildings and structures in Beaverton, Oregon
Public high schools in Oregon
Magnet schools in Oregon
1992 establishments in Oregon
Beaverton School District